A Certain Justice is an Adam Dalgliesh novel by P. D. James, published in 1997. A three episode 1998 TV mini-series was made based upon the novel.

Plot summary
Venetia Aldridge is a brilliant criminal lawyer who is set to take over as the Head of Chambers in Pawlet Court, London. She successfully defends Garry Ashe against the charge of the murder of his aunt but is unprepared when her daughter flaunts her emotional involvement with him. Venetia is murdered in her office soon after her trial. Adam Dalgliesh investigates what appears to be an inside job. Things are not as simple as they seem as all the suspects appear to have unbreakable alibis. A second murder occurs later in the narrative and there is a tantalising ending when one of the "murderers" appears to confess with the knowledge that the case could never come to trial because of a lack of evidence.

Major themes
The book also explores the psyche of a pathological criminal, the moral dilemmas of the defence lawyer and the repercussions of a successful defence of a murderer on those who are alive, including the victim's survivors and the defence lawyer herself. It is also a comment on the limitations of the criminal justice system.

Reception
In a 1997 book review for The New York Times, Ben Mcintyre called the book "vintage James" and summarized it as "a book in which revenge is not quite sated and deserts are not always just. That may not be the most satisfying conclusion, but it contains a certain truth."

Adaptations
A television version of the novel was produced for Britain's ITV network in 1998. It starred Roy Marsden as Adam Dalgliesh.

Release details
1997, UK, Faber & Faber, Pub date 1 October 1997, hardback (First edition)
1997, Canada, Alfred A. Knopf, Pub date 21 October 1997, hardback
1999, USA, Ballantine Books, Pub date ? January 1999, paperback
1999, UK, Penguin Books, Pub date 14 January 1999, paperback
1999, Canada, Vintage Books, Pub date 15 June 1999, paperback

References

External links

1997 British novels
Novels by P. D. James
Faber and Faber books
British novels adapted into television shows
British detective novels